This is a list of rural localities in Tyumen Oblast. Tyumen Oblast (Tyumenskaya oblast) is a federal subject (an oblast) of Russia. It is geographically located in the Western Siberia region of Siberia, and is administratively part of the Urals Federal District. The oblast has administrative jurisdiction over two autonomous okrugs: Khanty–Mansi Autonomous Okrug and Yamalo-Nenets Autonomous Okrug. Tyumen Oblast including its autonomous okrugs is the third-largest federal subject by area, and has a population of 3,395,755 (2010).

Tyumen Oblast 

 Abalak
 Abatskoye
 Armizonskoye
 Aromashevo
 Baykal
 Berdyuzhye
 Bolshoye Sorokino
 Isetskoye
 Kazanskoye
 Nizhnyaya Tavda
 Omutinskoye
 Pokrovskoye
 Sladkovo
 Uporovo
 Uvat
 Vagay
 Vikulovo
 Yarkovo
 Yurginskoye

Khanty-Mansi Autonomous Okrug 

 Leushi
 Nyaksimvol
 Sergino

Yamalo-Nenets Autonomous Okrug 

 Antipayuta
 Aksarka
 Katrovozh
 Krasnoselkup
 Muzhi
 Nakhodka
 Novy Port
 Tazovsky
 Yamburg

See also 

 
 Lists of rural localities in Russia

References 

Tyumen Oblast